The Beijing Planning Exhibition Hall (Chinese: 北京市规划展览馆) is an urban planning museum located at 20 Qianmen E St in the old main railway station building from 1903, beside Tiananmen Square in Beijing, China. The exhibition hall opened to the public on the 9 September 2004, and features a scale model of the entire Beijing metropolitan area, as well as multimedia exhibits on the history, current situation, and future of urban planning in Beijing.

See also
 List of museums in China

External links

Official website of Beijing Planning Exhibition Hall

Buildings and structures in Beijing
Tourist attractions in Beijing
Architecture museums in China
Museums in Beijing
2004 establishments in China
Urban planning museums